Leyden Street (Originally named First Street, afterward in the Records called
Great and Broad Street; named Leyden Street in 1823, also known as Leiden Street or The Street), is a street in Plymouth, Massachusetts that was created in 1620 by the Pilgrims, and claims to be the oldest continuously inhabited  street in the Thirteen Colonies of British North America.

History

The Pilgrims first began laying out the street before Christmas in 1620 after disembarking from the Mayflower, allegedly on nearby Plymouth Rock. The original settlers built their houses along the street from the shore up to the base of Burial Hill where the original fort building was located and now is the site of a cemetery and First Church of Plymouth. Town Brook is adjacent to the street and provided drinking water for the early colonists. Governor William Bradford, Dr. Samuel Fuller, Peter Browne and other settlers owned lots along the road. The famed First Thanksgiving was likely held nearby in 1621. In 1823 the street was named Leyden Street after the city in Holland that offered the Pilgrims refuge before coming to America. Leyden Street, as it looked in 1627, has been re-created at nearby Plimoth Plantation. Although other streets such as those in Jamestown, Virginia, were used intermittently, Leyden Street has been used continuously since the original settlers built houses along the lane.

References

Gallery

See also
Old County Courthouse
First Church in Plymouth
Burial Hill

Streets in Massachusetts
Plymouth, Massachusetts
Plymouth Colony
Transportation in Plymouth County, Massachusetts